Broucke is a surname. Notable people with the surname include:

Mireille Broucke, daughter of Roger, American and Canadian control theorist
Roger A. Broucke (1932–2005), father of Mireille, Belgian and American aerospace engineer

See also
Broek (disambiguation)
Van den Broeck